The 2015 Western Balkans Summit was the second annual summit of heads of states and governments of Western Balkans. It took place in the Vienna, Austria, following the 2014 Conference of Western Balkan States that took place in Berlin, Germany. This summit forms part of the Berlin Process, a five-year process marked by yearly summits in order to underline the commitment to Future enlargement of the European Union towards the Western Balkans region. Official date of summit is 27 of August 2015. After 2014 conference Günther Oettinger confirmed that the event will be organised annually with Vienna as a host city in 2015 and Paris in 2016.

The focus of the Berlin Process is on countries of the region that are not yet members of European Union (Albania, Bosnia and Herzegovina, Kosovo, Republic of Macedonia, Montenegro and Serbia) with participation of countries who have committed themselves to organise summit meetings (Germany, Austria, France and Italy) and with strong support by Slovenia and Croatia.

The conference notably overlapped with the Burgenland corpses discovery incident which influenced public attitudes towards European asylum policies.

Regional activities before The Summit
Civil society initiative The Balkans in Europe Policy Advisory Group (BiEPAG) organized three preparatory meetings in Tirana, Belgrade and Sarajevo. The first preparatory meeting held in Tirana focused on job creation and prosperity. Second meeting in Belgrade took place on 25 May 2015 with aim to discuss recommendations for policy analysis ahead of the Vienna Western Balkans Summit and with topics of culture of regional cooperation, creation of jobs and prosperity, freedom of expression and bilateral disputes on agenda. Third preparatory meeting took place in Sarajevo in June 2015 with focus on freedom of expression.  On the day of the Summit, civil society representatives will have the possibility to present their concrete proposals to the present politicians.

Notes and references
Notes:

References:

See also
Berlin Process
Southeast Europe
Stabilisation and Association Process
Central European Free Trade Agreement
Stability Pact for South Eastern Europe

External links
 Western Balkans Summit

2015 in politics
Diplomatic conferences in Austria
21st-century diplomatic conferences (Europe)
2015 in international relations
2015 conferences
Foreign relations of Croatia
Foreign relations of Albania
Foreign relations of Bosnia and Herzegovina
Foreign relations of Kosovo
Foreign relations of North Macedonia
Foreign relations of Montenegro
Foreign relations of Serbia
Foreign relations of Slovenia
International relations in Southeastern Europe
Contemplated enlargements of the European Union
2010s in Vienna
August 2015 events in Europe